The reticulated poison frog (Ranitomeya ventrimaculata), known in French as dendrobate à ventre tacheté, is a species of poison dart frog. It is native to South America, where it can be found in Brazil, southeastern Colombia, Ecuador, French Guiana, and Peru.

Toxicity
R. ventrimaculata secretes poison through glands in the skin which protect it from fungi and bacteria as well as from predators, which are also warned to stay clear by the aposematic coloration. It is therefore often included among the poison dart frogs, although its toxin is comparatively weak. R. ventrimaculatus produces its poison by ingestion of a species of mite.

Description 
The frog is active during the day. Its base color is black, and it has yellow lines or dots on the back, whereas the belly has bluish or grayish color with interspersed black patches (hence the name "ventrimaculatus"); the color of the belly continues into a netlike pattern on the legs.

R. ventrimaculata reach adulthood at an age of six months. The females attach four to eight eggs to leaves beneath the water level, where they are inseminated by the male. The tadpoles leave the eggs after 12 to 16 days, the male carries them one by one to puddles or similar minute bodies of water; as the tadpoles are omnivorous and cannibalistic, they are separated from each other in the process. Metamorphosis into a frog is complete after 60 to 80 days; at which point they become independent of their parents but tend to remain in close proximity.

Habitat
It lives in tropical rainforests, in trees and sometimes on the ground. It is threatened by habitat loss.

References

Poison dart frogs
Ranitomeya
Amphibians of Brazil
Amphibians of Colombia
Amphibians of Ecuador
Amphibians of French Guiana
Amphibians of Peru
Amphibians described in 1935
Taxa named by Benjamin Shreve